Haselgrove is a surname. Notable people with the surname include:

C. Brian Haselgrove (1926–1964), English mathematician
Colin Haselgrove, English archaeologist and academic
Jenifer Haselgrove (1930–2015), English physicist and computer scientist